

This is a list of the National Register of Historic Places listings in Pinal County, Arizona.

This is intended to be a complete list of the properties and districts on the National Register of Historic Places in Pinal County, Arizona, United States.  The locations of National Register properties and districts for which the latitude and longitude coordinates are included below, may be seen in a map.

There are 107 properties and districts listed on the National Register in the county, including two National Monuments and one National Historic Landmark.  There are also five former listings.

Current listings

|}

Former listings

|}

See also

 List of National Historic Landmarks in Arizona
 National Register of Historic Places listings in Arizona

References

Pinal